The National Sport School (NSS) is a public high school (secondary school) in Calgary, Alberta which teaches grades 9 through 12.  In partnership with Winsport Canada, the school was created to support student athletes with Olympic potential. Developmental and competitive athletes (current and potential) are able to train and travel internationally, while staying in school.  It was founded in 1994 as the first national sport school in the country.

In 2003, NSS moved from its prior location at William Aberhart High School, into the northwest corner of the building housing Ernest Manning High School. In September 2011, the NSS moved from Ernest Manning to Canada Olympic Park in the Athletic & Ice Complex due to the old Ernest Manning location closing for LRT construction. The National Sport School is now located in the Markin MacPhail Centre at WinSport, next to training centers, ice rinks, and the Calgary Gymnastics Centre.

Special accommodations
An athlete's schedule is handled, by allowing students to enter or exit the program throughout the year, without losing credit for work already done (which would occur in a normal 2x5-month semester program).  There is a low student-teacher ratio, for added attention.  Also, on average, students have access to three computers each, including laptops.  Students can remotely stay in contact with their teachers, even when away on competitions.

Calgary's Olympic legacy
The school is physically located to be sufficiently close to major sports facilities within Calgary, many of which were built for the 1988 Winter Olympics held in Calgary. CODA was the organization that ran those Olympics, and their support for the school, is intended to be part of the legacy of those games (along with the sports facilities).

Notable alumni
This section may include current and past students of the school (whether they graduated or not).

International medal winners
Jennifer Botterill -  Was on gold medal winning ice hockey team in the 2002 and 2006 Winter Olympics.
Deidra Dionne - Won bronze in 2002 Winter Olympics in freestyle aerial ski
Blythe Hartley - Won bronze at 2004 Summer Olympics for diving
Kaillie Humphries - Won gold medals in two-woman bobsled at the 2010 and 2014 Winter Olympics, and bronze in two-woman bobsled at the 2018 Winter Olympics. Won gold in one-woman bobsled (monobob) at the 2022 Winter Olympics.
Alanna Kraus - Won bronze at 2002 Winter Olympics and silver at 2006 Winter Olympics in short-track speed skating
Carla MacLeod - Won gold in ice hockey at the 2006 Winter Olympics 
Jessica Sloan - Won six gold medals at the 2000 Summer Paralympics
Kyle Shewfelt - Won gold in gymnastics at the 2004 Summer Olympics

2006 Olympics
Athletes who have attended the school and competed for Canada at the 2006 Winter Olympics:

References

"A Hard Road to Athens: A top gymnast pays the price to achieve her dream" (May 3, 2004) By Brian Bergman.  Maclean's
"It's the best teaching job ever: Gail Whiteford excels at school for gifted athletes" By Tom Barrett. Edmonton Journal Edmonton, Alta.: Aug 28, 2005. pg. I.3
"Students sweat and study in style: National Sport School shifts base" By Lauren MacGillivray. Calgary Herald. Calgary, Alta.: Sep 18, 2003. pg. D.9
"National Sports School expands" Star - Phoenix. Saskatoon, Sask.: May 10, 2003. pg. B.4
Durrie, Karen Rudolph, "A sporting change: Programs allow young competitors to excel at athletics - and academics", Calgary Herald, March 30, 2006. (Alternative Schooling Special Section).  p. AS3.

Further reading
Petrich, Ivana, "Sports school supports athletes' dreams in flight", Calgary Herald, January 26, 2006. pg. N.12 (written by student at NSS)

External links
Official site of school

High schools in Calgary
Educational institutions established in 1994
Sports organizations of Canada
1994 establishments in Alberta
Sports schools